Jeong Rae-hyuk (17 January 1926 – 17 May 2022) was a South Korean military officer and politician. He served as Minister of Commerce and Industry from 1961 to 1962 and Minister of National Defense from 1970 to 1971. He was also a member of the National Assembly from 1973 to 1985. He died in Seoul on 17 May 2022 at the age of 96.

References

1926 births
2022 deaths
People from South Jeolla Province
Members of the National Assembly (South Korea)
National Defense ministers of South Korea
Speakers of the National Assembly (South Korea)
Korea Military Academy alumni
United States Army War College alumni
Imperial Japanese Army Academy alumni
Industry ministers